Carnotaurini is a tribe of the theropod dinosaur family Abelisauridae from the Late Cretaceous period of Patagonia. It includes the dinosaurs Carnotaurus sastrei; the type species, Aucasaurus garridoi, and Abelisaurus comahuensis. This group was first proposed by paleontologists Rodolfo Coria,  Luis Chiappe, and Lowell Dingus in 2002, being defined as a clade containing "Carnotaurus sastrei, Aucasaurus garridoi, their most recent common ancestor, and all of its decendants."

Description

Anatomical description and geological distribution
Carnotaurins were relatively lightly built but large theropods, ranging in size from 6.1-7.8 m (20-25.6 ft) and 1400–2000 kg  (1.6-2.3 tons) in weight. Their geographical distribution lied in South America, as all three species have been found in various formations in Argentina, being the Anacleto Formation of the Rio Colorado Subgroup in the Neuquén Basin and possibly the Sir Fernandez field of the Allen Formation to the southeast. They are considered the most derived abelisaurids, with traits like very short, narrow skulls and extremely reduced forearms, even more so than other abelisaurids.

Paleobiology
Studies on the skull anatomy on the nominal species, Carnotaurus sastrei, debate over what type of prey these animals hunted. Studies by Mazzetta et al. 1998, 2004, and 2009 suggest that the jaw structure in Carnotaurus was built for swift, instead of strong, bites, with adaptations for mandibular kinesis to assist in swallowing small prey items whole. Surprisingly, it exhibits a form of paracraniokinesis in which the dentary bone articulates against the surangular bone, further jointing the lower jaw and hypothetically allowing this animal a wider array of hunting strategies.

However, in 1998 and 2009, Robert Bakker and Francois Therrien and colleagues contested this finding, stating that Carnotaurus had the exact same skull adaptations (short snout, small teeth, and a fortified occiput) as the Jurassic theropod Allosaurus, which presumably preyed upon large animals by gradual jaw slashing.

Locomotion

Mazzetta et al. 1998-1999 and Phil Currie  et al. 2011 found Carnotaurus to be a swift-running predator with semicursorial adaptations such as femoral resistance against bending moments and a hypertrophied caudofemoralis muscle, the primary locomotory muscle in theropods which was located in the tail and pulled the femur backwards. This enlarged caudofemoralis, giving them a speed estimate of 48–56 km/ph (30-35 mph), allowing carnotaurins to be one of the fastest-running large theropod groups known yet.

Systematics

Past
The tribe Carnotaurini was named in 2002 by Rodolfo Coria et al. in 2002 after their discovery of Aucasaurus garridoi. They phylogenetically defined it as the most inclusive clade containing Carnotaurus sastrei, Aucasaurus garridoi, their most recent common ancestor, and all of its descendants. Their morphological definition of it is by several synapomorphies of the clade, with two ambiguous ones being: "the presence of hyposphene–hypantrum articulations in the proximal and middle sections of the caudal series, and cranial processes in the epipophyses of the cervical vertebrae." They defined more ambiguous synapomorphies due to the homologous materials not yet found in all other abelisaurids being: "a very broad coracoid (coracoid maximum width three times the distance across the scapular glenoid area), a humerus with a large and hemispherical head, an extremely short ulna and radius (ulna to humerus ratio 1:3 or less), and frontal prominences (swells or horns) that are located laterally on the skull roof." The relatively outdated cladogram that they found is as follows:

Later in 2009, the carnotaurine Skorpiovenator was described by Juan Canale, Carlos Scanferla, Federico Agnolin, and Fernando E. Novas, who performed another phylogenetic study supporting the monophyly of Carnotaurini:

Present
According to the modern consensus, as of the cladogram published in the description of Tralkasaurus cuyi after Cerroni et al. 2020, the tribe also contains Abelisaurus comahuensis, which has been found to be the closest relative of  Aucasaurus garridoi and has been united with it under the clade Abelisaurinae across multiple occasions.

References

Abelisaurs
Late Cretaceous dinosaurs of South America